Andrea Kuklová ( Chupíková, born July 16, 1971) is a former Slovak professional basketball player who played in the WNBA and FIBA EuroLeague Women. She played for a team in Slovakia. She competed for Czechoslovakia in the women's tournament at the 1992 Summer Olympics.

References

External links
 
 
 
 

1971 births
Living people
Basketball players at the 1992 Summer Olympics
Olympic basketball players of Czechoslovakia
Phoenix Mercury draft picks
Phoenix Mercury players
Point guards
Shooting guards
Slovak expatriate basketball people in the United States
Slovak expatriate basketball people in Germany
Slovak women's basketball players
Sportspeople from Poprad